The New York City Department of Citywide Administrative Services (DCAS) is a City of New York government agency. It's mission is to make city government work for all New Yorkers. It is responsible for: 

 Recruiting, hiring, and training City employees.
 Managing 55 public buildings.
 Acquiring, selling, and leasing City property.
 Purchasing over $1 billion in goods and services for City agencies.
 Overseeing the greenest municipal vehicle fleet in the country.
 Leading the City's efforts to reduce carbon emissions from government operations.

History
The New York City Department of Citywide Administrative Services was created in 1996 when Mayor Rudolph W. Giuliani merged the Department of General Services and the Department of Personnel. The Department of Citywide Administrative Services Law Enforcement special Officers was started in 1996 with approximately 10 special officers assigned to various DCAS facilities.

Commissioners
Chapter 35, section 810 of the New York City Charter states "There shall be a department of citywide administrative services, the head of which shall be the commissioner of citywide administrative services."

DCAS Police
The New York City Department of Citywide Administrative Services has a law enforcement branch to protect DCAS facilities and personnel. DCAS Police are Special Officers of New York City, under New York State Criminal Procedure law, chapter subdivision 40, §2.10, which gives them limited powers of New York State peace officers.

See also
New York City Department of Citywide Administrative Services Police
New York State Department of Civil Service
Law enforcement in New York City

References

External links
 New York City Department of Citywide Administrative Services
 Department of Citywide Administrative Services in the Rules of the City of New York

Citywide Administrative Services